HFK may refer to:
 Hans-Freudenberg-Kolleg, a dormitory in Karlsruhe, Germany
 University of the Arts Bremen
 Hopeless Fountain Kingdom, 2017 studio album by Halsey